Prinzhorn Dance School is the eponymous debut album by British alternative rock band Prinzhorn Dance School.  It was released on August 13, 2007 in the UK and August 28 in North America.

The album was recorded in a National Trust cottage in Devon and a barn in Sussex, before being mixed in New York City with the DFA.

Track listing 
"Black Bunker"
"Do You Know Your Butcher?"
"Worker"
"Don't Talk To Strangers"
"Hamworthy Sports & Leisure Centre"
"You Are The Space Invader"
"Eat, Sleep"
"I Do Not Like Change"
"Lawyers Water Jug"
"Realer, Pretender"
"No Books"
"Up! Up! Up!"
"Crackerjack Docker"
"See M Dahlia"
"Crash, Crash, Crash"
"Spaceman In Your Garden"

References

2007 albums
Prinzhorn Dance School albums